Takeshi Inoue (born December 20, 1972) known by his stage name , is a Japanese retired professional wrestler, who worked for Pro Wrestling Noah. He is also a former sumo wrestler.

Sumo career 
He made his sumo debut in March 1988, after leaving junior high school. He joined at the same time as future yokozuna Takanohana and Wakanohana. He initially  trained at the same stable as these two, Futagoyama-beya, but when former yokozuna Takanosato branched off to set up Naruto-beya in March 1989, Inoue was one of the young recruits to follow him to the new stable. He also changed his shikona, or fighting name, from Futagozakura to Rikio. In July 1993 he was promoted to the second highest jūryō division, becoming the first wrestler from Naruto stable to reach elite sekitori status. He was demoted from that division after just one tournament, but returned to jūryō in May 1994 and was promoted to the top makuuchi division in July 1996 after winning his second jūryō yūshō, or tournament championship. In September 1997 he was promoted to his highest rank of maegashira 4, but he did not take part in the tournament. This was initially said to be due to a liver disorder, but it was later revealed that relations with his stablemaster had broken down, and Rikio was forced to retire from sumo. Due to the dispute he was unable to have a formal retirement ceremony, but some of his friends in the sumo world organised an informal one for him in early 1998, with Akebono and Konishiki among the attendees.

Professional wrestling career 
After leaving sumo he was soon scouted by All Japan Pro Wrestling.  After training in their dojo, he made his debut in 2000 in a tag team match in which he partnered Masao Inoue against Takeshi Morishima and Jun Akiyama. However, before he could build any momentum, Mitsuharu Misawa left AJPW and in the process, took most of the native talent with Rikio being among these talents. In Pro Wrestling Noah, he has seen much success. He dethroned the legendary Kenta Kobashi for the GHC Heavyweight Championship (at the end of this match Rikio can be seen sobbing as he accepts the title from Kobashi), ending his two-year reign, before losing the title to Akira Taue some time later. On June 4, 2006, he captured his second GHC Tag Team Championship with Jun Akiyama when he pinned Muhammad Yone after a Musou. However, Rikio and Akiyama were forced to vacate their title on September 25, 2006 after Rikio suffered a neck injury.

On November 27, 2011, Rikio announced his retirement from professional wrestling due to serious neck injuries.

Championships and accomplishments 
Nikkan Sports
Outstanding Performance Award (2005)
Pro Wrestling Illustrated
PWI ranked him #82 of the top 500 singles wrestlers in the PWI 500 in 2010
Pro Wrestling Noah
GHC Heavyweight Championship (1 time)
GHC Tag Team Championship (3 times) – with Takeshi Morishima (1), Jun Akiyama (1) and Muhammad Yone (1)
Two Day Tag Team Tournament (2004) – with Naomichi Marufuji
Global Tag League Outstanding Performance Prize (2008) – with Jun Akiyama
Tokyo Sports
Outstanding Performance Award (2005)
Rookie of the Year (2000)

Sumo career record

See also
List of sumo tournament second division champions
Glossary of sumo terms
List of past sumo wrestlers

References

External links

Profile at Green Destiny

Japanese male professional wrestlers
Living people
Japanese sumo wrestlers
1972 births
Sumo people from Nara Prefecture
GHC Heavyweight Champions
GHC Tag Team Champions